The China women's national basketball team represents the People's Republic of China in international women's basketball tournaments. The national team is governed by the Chinese Basketball Association (CBA).

Tournament record

Olympic Games
1984 –  3rd place
1988 – 6th place
1992 –  2nd place
1996 – 9th place
2004 – 9th place
2008 – 4th place
2012 – 6th place
2016 – 10th place
2020 – 5th place

Women's World Cup
1983 –  3rd place
1986 – 5th place
1990 – 9th place
1994 –  2nd place
1998 – 12th place
2002 – 6th place
2006 – 12th place
2010 – 13th place
2014 – 6th place
2018 – 6th place
2022 –  2nd place

Women's Asia Cup
 Gold: 1976, 1986, 1990, 1992, 1994, 1995, 2001, 2004, 2005, 2009, 2011
 Silver: 1978, 1980, 1982, 1984, 1988, 1990, 2007, 2015, 2019, 2021
 Bronze: 1997, 2013, 2017

Asian Games
 Gold; 1982, 1986, 2002, 2006, 2010, 2018
 Silver; 1978, 1990, 1998, 2014
 Bronze; 1974, 1994

Team

Current roster
Roster for the 2022 FIBA Women's Basketball World Cup.

See also
China national basketball team
China women's national under-19 basketball team
China women's national under-17 basketball team

References

External links

FIBA profile

 
Women's national basketball teams